IFSP, or radial parallel interface, was a parallel interface similar to the Centronics connector (IEEE 1284) but incompatible, as it had different signal polarities and handshake protocol. It was used in printers and computers manufactured in Comecon.

All printer input signal lines were pulled up to +5V by a 220 Ohm resistor, and pulled down to ground by a 330 Ohm resistor. This allowed usage of longer cables compared to Centronics, but overloaded most usual Centronics adapters.

Some devices allowed switching between IFSP and Centronics modes, i.e. Robotron 6319—6329 were manufactured with interchangeable interface modules, allowing usage of IFSP, IFSS and Centronics.

Signal description

See also 
 robotron technik

Computer buses